Rishihood University is a Private University located in Sonipat, Haryana, India. It was established in 2020 after the Haryana Legislative Assembly passed the Haryana Private Universities (Amendment) Act, 2020.

Schools
The University consists of five schools:

 School of Creativity
 School of Education
 School of Entrepreneurship
 School of Healthcare
 Rashtram School of Public Leadership

Academics
The University offers undergraduate & postgraduate courses in creativity, education, healthcare & entrepreneurship. The University has academic and research tie up with Ural State University, Russia & Kyungdong University, South Korea.

Notable faculty
Sampadananda Mishra

Recognition and approval

Rishihood University is established under The Haryana Private Universities (Amendment) Act, 2020. The university is approved by the University Grants Commission (India).

Campus
The University campus spreads over 25 acre campus situated in Sonipat, Haryana.

References

Universities in Haryana
Private universities in India
Educational institutions established in 2020
2020 establishments in Haryana